Hillside Estates, Alberta may refer to:

Hillside Estates, Parkland County, Alberta, a locality in Parkland County, Alberta
Hillside Estates, St. Paul County No. 19, Alberta, a locality in St. Paul County No. 19, Alberta